The Uninvited, also known as Victim of the Haunt, The Haunting of Patricia Johnson, and The House at the End of the Street, is a 1996 made-for-TV film directed by Larry Shaw and starring Sharon Lawrence and Beau Bridges. Inspired by true events, the film was written by Karen Clark.

Overview
The infamous haunting events in the film have also been depicted in other supernatural television shows, including Haunted Lives: True Ghost Stories, Sightings and A Haunting. The film premiered as a Tuesday Night Movie special on CBS near the Halloween season. The film was viewed by 8.5 million viewers and received a 15 share while holding 3rd place in its time slot.

Plot

Inspired by true events. After Patti Johnson gives birth to a still-born child, she and her husband try to forget the tragedy. They move into a new house, but a number of supernatural phenomena that takes place there, lead them to believe that the house is haunted. Patti turns to the town psychic, who confirms her suspicions about ghostly activity. The house is haunted by the spirit of a man who, 75 years earlier, killed his young son and was then shot by his own wife, as well as by the spirit of the murdered son. And now the killer is after Patti's 3-year-old son, Jonathan.

Cast
Sharon Lawrence as Pattie Johnson
Beau Bridges as Charles Johnson
Shirley Knight as Delia
Alex D. Linz as Jonathan Johnson
Emily Bridges as Molly
Lawrence Pressman as Winston
James Pickens Jr. as Cornelson
Kathleen Lloyd as Laurette
Lesley Woods as Charlotte
Lauren Bowles as Sarah Parrish
Lynn Griffith as Martha
Stephen Lee as Bruce
Steven Griffith as Officer Friendly

Releases
The film premiered on CBS on October 29, 1996 and was released on DVD on September 28, 2004, under the title, Victim of the Haunt.

References

1996 television films
1996 films
American haunted house films
American films based on actual events
CBS network films
1990s American films